The right gastric vein (pyloric vein) drains blood from the lesser curvature of the stomach into the hepatic portal vein. It is part of the portal circulation.

Structure 
The right gastric vein passes right along the lesser curvature of the stomach to the pylorus. Once there, it joins onto the portal vein before the duodenum. The prepyloric vein is the last connecting branch onto the right gastric vein, marking the end of the stomach, and draining the proximal part of the duodenum.

Function 
The right gastric vein drains deoxygenated blood from the lesser curvature of the stomach.

See also 

 Left gastric vein

References

External links
 

Veins of the torso
Stomach